The following is a complete list of the presidents of North Dakota State University (which is located in Fargo, North Dakota).

(1890-1893) Horace E. Stockbridge
(1893-1895) J. B. Powers* 
(1895-1916) John H. Worst
(1916-1921) Edwin F. Ladd
(February - September, 1921) Edward S. Keene*
(1921-1929) John Lee Coulter
(July - September, 1929) A. E. Minard*
(1929-1937) John B. Shepperd
(1937-1938) John C. West*
(1938-1946) Frank L. Eversull
(June - July, 1946) Charles A. Sevrinson*
(1946-1948) John H. Longwell 
(1948-1961) Fred S. Hultz
(1961-1962) Arlon G. Hazen*  
(1962-1967) H. R. Albrecht  
(1968-1987) L. D. Loftsgard
(October, 1987 - May, 1988) Robert Koob*
(1988-1995) J. L. Ozbun
(1995-1998) Thomas R. Plough 
(1998-June, 1999) Allan Fischer* 
(1999-2009) Joseph A. Chapman 
(December, 2009 - July, 2010) Richard Hansen*
(2010-2022) Dean L. Bresciani
(2022-Present) David J. Cook
(*- acting)

University
North Dakota State